Benjamin Charles Wegg-Prosser (born June 1974) is managing partner of Global Counsel, a London-based strategic consultancy and lobbying organisation which has as its chair Peter Mandelson. Wegg-Prosser was Tony Blair's Director of Strategic Communications at 10 Downing Street.

Early life
Wegg-Prosser's father is the solicitor Stephen Wegg-Prosser. His mother Victoria, née Bird, has been a producer for the BBC.

His grandfather Charles Wegg-Prosser was a parliamentary candidate for the British Union of Fascists before repudiating the party and joining Labour. After service in the British Army in World War II, his grandfather served as a councillor on the Metropolitan Borough of Paddington for many years in the 1940s and 1950s, and then an alderman.

Career
Wegg-Prosser worked for Peter Mandelson before leaving in December 1998 and working briefly for media group Pearson PLC, before joining The Guardian in 2000. His father acted for Mandelson in the purchase of a home which was investigated by the Parliamentary Commissioner for Standards in 1999.

At The Guardian he held positions as publisher of The Guardian’s politics website, general manager of the education website, and finally publisher of Society Guardian. As publisher of the latter he launched a series of brand extensions including conferences, books, magazines and new sections in the newspaper.

From 2005 to 2007 Wegg-Prosser was Tony Blair's Director of Strategic Communications at 10 Downing Street, where he oversaw a series of innovations including the launch of Downing Street's e-petitions service.
He also implemented the first YouTube channel for any head of government, which Blair launched in April 2007.

In 2007 he joined SUP Media, a Moscow-based digital media company, where he was Director of Corporate Development. SUP Media is a Moscow-based online media company which owns LiveJournal.com, Championat.ru, Gazeta.ru, +SOl and Victory SA. In 2008 he additionally became a consultant for recently created public relations company The Ledbury Group, focusing on new media and political relations. 

As of 2013, Wegg-Prosser is managing partner of Global Counsel, a London-based strategic consultancy which is chaired  by Peter Mandelson. In April that year, Wegg-Prosser became a director of the Labour Party supporting blog LabourList.

In September 2013, Wegg-Prosser released internal 10 Downing Street emails about the internal fight in September 2006 to prevent Tony Blair being replaced as Prime Minister by Gordon Brown, which eventually happened in June 2007.

Wegg-Prosser is a funder of Labour Tomorrow, a campaigning group with several senior Labour Party figures on its board, which opposes the leadership of Jeremy Corbyn.

References

External links
 YouTube Labour:vision channel

1974 births
Living people
British publishers (people)
British public relations people